John Abernethy Kingdon (1828–1906) was a nineteenth century surgeon and historian.

Biography
He was the son of the surgeon William Kingdon and had John Abernethy as godfather.

Kingdon was a member of the Worshipful Company of Grocers. He became an influential figure within the livery company. He was for many years of their governing body, the court and was  Master in 1883. He edited and wrote an introduction to Facsimile of first volume of ms. archives of the Worshipful Company of Grocers of the city of London, A.D. 1345-1463. He also wrote about Thomas Poyntz and Richard Grafton, two sixteenth century members of the Grocers Company who had been involved in getting English translations of the Bible printed.

He died in January 1906 and was buried on the western side of Highgate Cemetery.

References

English surgeons
19th-century English historians
1828 births
1906 deaths
Burials at Highgate Cemetery